The 1980 Calder Cup playoffs of the American Hockey League began on April 8, 1980. The playoff format was expanded from six to eight teams. The eight teams that qualified played best-of-seven series for Division Semifinals and Division Finals. The division champions played a best-of-seven series for the Calder Cup.  The Calder Cup Final ended on May 17, 1980, with the Hershey Bears defeating the New Brunswick Hawks four games to two to win the Calder Cup for the sixth time in team history.

Playoff seeds
After the 1979–80 AHL regular season, the top four teams from each division qualified for the playoffs. The New Haven Nighthawks finished the regular season with the best overall record.

Northern Division
New Brunswick Hawks - 96 points
Nova Scotia Voyageurs - 93 points
Maine Mariners - 93 points
Adirondack Red Wings - 75 points

Southern Division
New Haven Nighthawks - 101 points
Hershey Bears - 76 points
Syracuse Firebirds - 69 points
Rochester Americans - 66 points

Bracket

In each round, the team that earned more points during the regular season receives home ice advantage, meaning they receive the "extra" game on home-ice if the series reaches the maximum number of games. There is no set series format due to arena scheduling conflicts and travel considerations.

Division Semifinals 
Note 1: Home team is listed first.
Note 2: The number of overtime periods played (where applicable) is not indicated

Northern Division

(1) New Brunswick Hawks vs. (4) Adirondack Red Wings

(2) Nova Scotia Voyageurs vs. (3) Maine Mariners

Southern Division

(1) New Haven Nighthawks vs. (4) Rochester Americans

(2) Hershey Bears vs. (3) Syracuse Firebirds

Division Finals

Northern Division

(1) New Brunswick Hawks vs. (2) Maine Mariners

Southern Division

(1) New Haven Nighthawks vs. (2) Hershey Bears

Calder Cup Final

(N1) New Brunswick Hawks vs. (S2) Hershey Bears

See also
1979–80 AHL season
List of AHL seasons

References

Calder Cup
Calder Cup playoffs